Dejan Janjatović (born 25 February 1992) is a German footballer who most recently played as a midfielder for FC Rorschach-Goldach.

Career
Janjatović is a product of the Bayern Munich Junior Team, and made an appearance for Bayern's reserve team in March 2011, replacing Mario Erb in a 3. Liga match against SV Babelsberg 03. He was released by Bayern at the end of the 2010–11 season and moved to Spain to sign for Getafe. After six months playing for Getafe's reserve team, he signed for Swiss side FC St. Gallen. After a spell in FC Vaduz, he was released in summer 2017.

After half a year of free agency, Janjatović signed for Polish side Bruk-Bet Termalica Nieciecza managed by Maciej Bartoszek. He made his Ekstraklasa debut in 2–4 loss against Zagłębie Lubin on 2 December 2017. In March 2018, after making 6 league appearances for Nieciecza, Janjatović left the club in a mutual agreement.

He is of Serbian descent, born in war-time Croatia and was called up to the German U18 and U19 national teams as well as Serbian U21 side. He is still eligible for the German and Serbian national teams.

On 16 February 2019, Janjatović joined SC Brühl.

Honours
FC Vaduz
Liechtenstein Football Cup: 2015–16, 2016–17

References

External links
 
 
 
 

1992 births
Living people
German people of Serbian descent
Sportspeople from Slavonski Brod
Serbs of Croatia
German footballers
Serbian footballers
Association football midfielders
Serbia youth international footballers
Germany youth international footballers
3. Liga players
Segunda División B players
Getafe CF B players
Swiss Super League players
Ekstraklasa players
FC Bayern Munich II players
Getafe CF footballers
FC St. Gallen players
FC Vaduz players
Bruk-Bet Termalica Nieciecza players
SC Brühl players
German expatriate footballers
German expatriate sportspeople in Spain
Expatriate footballers in Spain
German expatriate sportspeople in Switzerland
Expatriate footballers in Switzerland
German expatriate sportspeople in Poland
Expatriate footballers in Poland
German expatriate sportspeople in Liechtenstein
Expatriate footballers in Liechtenstein